Drazan Boric is a paralympic athlete from Germany competing mainly in category T53 wheelchair racing events.

Drazen competed in the 1996 Summer Paralympics without winning a medal, he competed in the 800m, 5000m, 10000m and marathon.  In the 2000 Summer Paralympics he again competed in the 800m and 400m and was a part of the bronze medal-winning German 4 × 400 m relay.

References

Paralympic athletes of Germany
Athletes (track and field) at the 1996 Summer Paralympics
Athletes (track and field) at the 2000 Summer Paralympics
Paralympic bronze medalists for Germany
German male wheelchair racers
Living people
Medalists at the 1996 Summer Paralympics
Medalists at the 2000 Summer Paralympics
Year of birth missing (living people)
Paralympic medalists in athletics (track and field)